Quest for Lost Heroes, published in 1990, is a novel by British fantasy writer David Gemmell. It is the fourth entry in the Drenai series. The story is set several decades after and makes several references to the events in Gemmell's earlier title, The King Beyond the Gate. It also provides a conclusion to the story of Tenaka Khan, one of the main protagonists of The King Beyond the Gate.

1990 British novels
British fantasy novels
Drenai
Novels by David Gemmell
Legend Books books